Cotoneaster franchetii (Franchet's cotoneaster or orange cotoneaster) is a species of Cotoneaster native to southwestern China, in the provinces of Guizhou, Sichuan, Tibet, and Yunnan, and also in adjacent northern Myanmar and northern Thailand.

The flowers are produced in corymbs of 5–15 together, each flower  diameter, with the five petals pink on the outer side, white on the inner side. The fruit is a red pome  diameter; they are eaten by fruit-eating birds who disperse the seeds in their droppings.

Two varieties are accepted by some authors, but not treated as distinct by the Flora of China:
Cotoneaster franchetii var. franchetii, described above  

Some authors include a third variety, var. sternianus, although more often, this is treated as a distinct species, Cotoneaster sternianus. As Cotoneaster sternianus it has gained the Royal Horticultural Society's Award of Garden Merit.

Cultivation and uses
Cotoneaster franchetii is a popular ornamental plant. It has escaped from cultivation and become locally naturalised in parts of the British Isles and the Pacific Northwest of North America, as well as Northern California.

Scientists at the Royal Horticultural Society (RHS) in the UK carried out a study on the effectiveness of hedges for soaking up air pollution, comparing different types of shrubs including cotoneaster, hawthorn, and western red cedar. They found that bushy, hairy-leafed varieties of cotoneaster, such as this, are “super plants” that can help soak up air pollution. On roads with heavy traffic, the dense, hairy-leaved Cotoneaster franchetii was at least 20% more effective at soaking up air pollution than other shrubs often planted along roadsides.

References

franchetii
Flora of Myanmar
Flora of China
Flora of Thailand